George Carew may refer to:

George Carew (admiral) (c. 1504–1545) soldier and adventurer, died in the sinking of the Tudor warship the Mary Rose
George Carew (priest) (1497/8–1583), English Anglican Dean of Christ Church, Dean of Windsor and Dean of Exeter
George Carew (diplomat) (died c. 1613), English diplomat and historian
George Carew, 1st Earl of Totnes (1555–1629), Baron Carew of Clopton, served under Elizabeth I and was appointed President of Munster, son of the Dean of Exeter
George Carew, 4th Baron Carew (1863–1926), younger son of Robert Shapland Carew
George Carew (cricketer) (1910–1974), West Indies cricketer